The Sumathi Popular Teledrama Actress Award is presented annually in Sri Lanka by the Sumathi Group of Campany associated with many commercial brands for the most Popular Sri Lankan actress of the year in television screen by the vote of the people.

The award was first given in 1995. Following is a list of the winners of this prestigious title since then.

References

Popular Actress
Awards for actresses